Ford Motor Company operates several proving grounds worldwide, for development and validation testing of new vehicles.

North America

Arizona Proving Ground (APG) - Wittmann, Arizona
Latitude and longitude: 

 
The Arizona Proving Ground opened in 1985.  The Proving Ground consists of 1,498 acres (6.06 km²) located less than one hour northwest of the Phoenix Sky Harbor Airport at an elevation of 1,650 feet (500 m).  The facility was originally a Volvo facility (VAPG) but was transitioned to the Ford branding in the summer of 2009 and renamed the Arizona Proving Ground (APG). Volvo still is a large user of it.

It features a 2-mile oval track with banked curves, a 2-mile completely straight road, a brake test area and some more tracks.

The Arizona Proving Ground is operated year round. The climate is of a desert type with low annual rainfall and low relative humidity. Daytime temperatures are high throughout the summer months. The winters are mild. Nighttime temperatures frequently drop below freezing during the three coldest months, but the afternoons are usually sunny and warm. The summer heat (over ) is the most used time of the year, since worst case should be tested in order to cover many test cases.

The facility is located on the outskirts of Phoenix.

Michigan Proving Ground (MPG) - Romeo, Michigan
Latitude and longitude: 

These grounds hold events like the Society of Automotive Engineers (SAE) Formula car competition (FSAE). This involves teams from colleges and universities around the world to compete in a competition involving both design and performance. The facility is also home to Twombly Mountain, the highest point in Macomb County.

Major facilities: High speed track, durability/special surface roads, grades, EMC facility, road simulators, fire resistance facility, vehicle dynamics area
Purpose: Car and truck durability, performance testing

Dearborn Development Center (formerly Dearborn Proving Ground (DPG))
Latitude and longitude: 

The Dearborn Development Center was built on the site of Ford Airport in Dearborn, Michigan.  The facility, formerly known as Dearborn Proving Ground (DPG), completed major reconstruction and renovations in 2006.

Extreme Cold Weather Test Facility (ECWTF) - Thompson, Manitoba
Latitude and longitude: 

The facility is located at the nearby Thompson Airport in Thompson, Manitoba, Canada.  The Extreme Cold Weather Test Facility offers vehicle testing in extremely cold weather conditions during the winter months from around November 1 to March 30.

Cuautitlan Proving Ground - Ford of Mexico - Cuautitlan, Mexico
Latitude and longitude: 
Stats : 245 acres (1 km²), 5 miles (8 km) of roads 
Major facilities: High speed track, special surface/low speed track, straightaway, handling course, grades, corrosion/salt bath, twin rolls
Major testing: Performance, ride, and handling; corrosion testing; emissions certification

Cold Climate Test Facility - Bemidji, Minnesota
Major facilities: Cold start positions, snow ingestion building
Major testing: Cold weather starting/drives, snow ingestion

Automatic Transmission New Product Center - Livonia, Michigan
Latitude and longitude: 
Major facilities: High speed track. Park pawl test ramp. Cold soak chambers

South America

Tatui Proving Ground (TPG), São Paulo, Brazil
Latitude and longitude: 
Stats : 1,200 acres (4.9 km²), 33 miles (53 km) of roads 
Major facilities: High speed track, special surface/low speed track, handling course, grades, salt bath, environmental exposure area
Major testing: Performance, ride, and handling; environmental simulation, corrosion testing

Europe

Dunton Technical Centre (DTC) - Basildon, Essex, England

Latitude and longitude: 
Proving ground for Ford UK.

Lommel Proving Grounds (LPG) - Lommel, Belgium
Latitude and longitude: 

The Lommel Proving Grounds, also known as Ford LPG, were constructed on land rented from the city of Lommel from 1960.

Stats: 796 acres (3.22 km²),  of roads
Major facilities: Humidity chambers, salt water/mud baths, straightaway, high speed track, durability road, special surfaces, side wind facility
Major testing: Car and light truck durability; performance, ride, and handling

Australia

Lara/You Yangs Proving Ground - Ford Australia  - You Yangs, Australia 
Latitude and longitude: 
Stats: 930 hectares (2,300 acres) Over 80 km (50 miles) of roads and tracks 
Major facilities include: 
Parabolic high speed track 4.8 km  
Special surfaces (Cobblestones, corrugations, Belgian blocks, etc.), Low speed track, High speed ride and handling course, Sealed and unsealed gradients, Sealed and unsealed skid pans, Salt/mud bath, Environmental exposure area, Crash test site, Climatic test chambers, Anechoic dyno chamber, High speed wind tunnel, Emissions testing laboratory. 
Major testing includes: 
Performance vehicle development, Vehicle ride and handling refinement, Environmental condition simulation, Vehicle corrosion, Noise vibration and harshness, Emissions control, Vehicle durability.

Former Ford Proving Grounds

Arizona Proving Ground (APG) - Yucca, Arizona
Latitude and longitude:  

Arizona Proving Ground (APG) was sold to Chrysler in 2007. This is no longer a Ford facility.

Cold Climate Test Facility - Raco, Michigan
Latitude and longitude: 

Facility now owned by Smithers Scientific Services

Florida Evaluation Center (FEC) - Naples, Florida
Latitude and longitude:  

This facility is no longer leased by Ford.  Ford sold the facility in 2002 to Harley Davidson. It has been taken over by Chrysler in early 2013 with Harley-Davidson leasing parts of the facility.

Stats: 530 acres (2.1 km²), 6.2 miles (10 km) of roads 
Major facilities: Straightaway, lane change area, handling course, sound test area
Major testing: Warm weather performance and handling

Notes

References

External links
Arizona Proving Ground
Michigan Proving Ground
You Yangs Proving Ground
Extreme Cold weather Test Facility
Dearborn Development Center DDC
VEV Ford Vehicle Testing 

Ford Motor Company facilities
Road test tracks by manufacturer